Common names: Dunn's hognosed pitviper.

Porthidium dunni is a species of venomous pitviper in the family Viperidae. The species is endemic to Mexico. There are no recognized subspecies.

Etymology
The specific name, dunni, is in honor of American herpetologist Emmett Reid Dunn "in appreciation of his work on American snake fauna".

Description
A moderately stout and terrestrial species, the tip of the snout is moderately elevated.

Geographic range
P. dunni is found in southern Mexico in the Pacific lowlands of Oaxaca and western Chiapas.

The type locality given is "the immediate vicinity of the village of Tehuantepec" [Oaxaca, Mexico].

Habitat
The preferred natural habitat of P. dunni is forest.

Reproduction
P. dunni is ovoviviparous.

Conservation status
The species P. dunni is classified as Least Concern (LC) on the IUCN Red List of Threatened Species (v3.1, 2007). Species are listed as such due to their wide distribution, presumed large population, or because it is unlikely to be declining fast enough to qualify for listing in a more threatened category. The population trend is stable. Year assessed: 2007.

References

Further reading
Hartweg N, Oliver JA (1938). "A Contribution to the Herpetology of the Isthmus of Tehuantepec: III. Three New Snakes from the Pacific Slope". Occasional Papers of the Museum of Zoology, University of Michigan (390): 1-8 + Plate I. (Trimeresurus dunni, new species, pages 6–7 + Plate I, Figures B & D).
Heimes P (2016). Snakes of Mexico: Herpetofauna Mexicana Vol. I. Frankfurt am Main, Germany: Chimaira. 572 pp. .
Mata-Silva V, Johnson JD, Wilson LD, García-Padilla E (2015). "The herpetofauna of Oaxaca, Mexico: composition, physiographic distribution, and conservation status". Mesoamerican Herpetology 2 (1): 6–62.
Mata-Silva V, Rocha A, DeSantis DL, García-Padilla E, Wilson LD (2016). "Porthidium dunni (Hartweg and Oliver, 1938). Arboreality". Mesoamerican Herpetology 3 (1): 156–157.

dunni
Snakes of North America
Endemic reptiles of Mexico
Fauna of the Southern Pacific dry forests
Reptiles described in 1938
Taxa named by Norman Edouard Hartweg